Gombe State School of Nursing and Midwifery was established under Gombe State University, Nigeria, in 2004  under the government of Governor Danjuma Goje, as a state-managed institution for the teaching of nursing and midwifery.

History 
The administration of Muhammad Inuwa Yahaya stated that the institution was established in line with the tripartite mission of institutions of higher education which involves teaching, research and service, as well as production of knowledge through research, building of an exemplary character in the individual student through learning and engaging the society in the exchange of ideas through service.

As governor, Muhammadu Inuwa Yahaya had announced the decision of relocating the state College of Nursing And Midwifery to Akko. A group known as Gombe North Awareness And Reform Initiative (GONARI) has appealed to the State Government to reverse the decision relocating the college. In 2021, there were plans by the Governor of Gombe State, Governor  Inuwa Yahaya to convert the abandoned building of the school to a campus of the Gombe State University.

Colleges in the school 

 Midwifery school
 Nursing school

Courses in Midwifery school 

 Basic Midwifery

Courses in Nursing school 

 Higher National Diploma (HND) in Nursing
 Post Basic Nursing

References 

Educational institutions established in 2004
2004 establishments in Nigeria